The International Maternal Pediatric Adolescent AIDS Clinical Trials Group, known as IMPAACT, is a United States-based research network which studies HIV and AIDS in infant, pediatric, adolescent and pregnant women populations. It is a member of the Office of HIV/AIDS Network Coordination research group.

Research
In 2012 IMPAACT published a study which found no link between the use of HIV medication and psychiatric illness in adolescents.

About
As of 2010, IMPAACT consisted of 39 domestic and 34 international clinical research sites.

References

External links
 

HIV/AIDS organizations in the United States